Marcin of Urzędów (ca. 1500–1573) was a Polish Roman Catholic priest, physician, pharmacist and botanist known especially for his Herbarz polski ("Polish Herbal").

Marcin, son of Szymon, was born ca. 1500-1502 in Urzędów, Lublin Voivodeship, Poland. From 1517 to 1525, he studied at the Jagiellonian University in Kraków. After graduation, he stayed at the university as a lecturer in physics, mathematics, logic and philosophy. He became the head of the university's Collegium Minus (Minor College) in 1529 and was named dean in 1533, the same year when he was ordained priest. Between 1533 and 1535, he continued his studies at the University of Padua in Italy where he achieved the degree of Doctor of Medicine. He later traveled to Venice, Switzerland and Hungary.

Upon his return to Poland, he was given a prebendary in Sandomierz. Marcin became a pastor at Urzędów parish in 1544 and additionally at another parish in nearby Modliborzyce in 1546. In 1563, he became a canon at the Cathedral of the Nativity of the Blessed Virgin Mary in Sandomierz.

Marcin ran the Holy Spirit Hospital in Sandomierz and, until 1561, worked as hetman Jan Tarnowski's court physician. Between 1542 and 1557, he was writing his two-volume opus magnum whose full title is Herbarz polski, to iest o przyrodzeniu zioł y drzew rozmaitych, y innych rzeczy do lekarztw należących ("Polish Herbal, or Of the Complexion of Various Herbs and Trees, and Other Things of which Medicines Comprise").

Marcin of Urzędów died on June 22, 1573 in Sandomierz where he was buried. The Polish Herbal was published in 1595, i.e. 22 years after its author's death.

See also
 List of Roman Catholic scientist-clerics

External links 
  Urzędów official website
  Full scan of ''Herbarz polski at Wielkopolska Biblioteka Cyfrowa (Greater Poland Digital Library)
  Grzaniec Marcina z Urzędowa (traditional hot wine based on Marcin's recipe)

1573 deaths
Jagiellonian University alumni
Academic staff of Jagiellonian University
16th-century Polish botanists
People from Sandomierz
Polish pharmacists
16th-century Polish physicians
16th-century Polish Roman Catholic priests
Catholic clergy scientists
University of Padua alumni
Year of birth uncertain